The year 1566 in science and technology included many events, some of which are listed here.

Biology
 Rembert Dodoens publishes  at Antwerp.

Civil engineering
 1566–67 – Completion of "Stari Most" bridge crossing the Neretva at Mostar by the Ottoman Empire (builder: Mimar Hayruddin).
 Autumn – Probable completion of the Exeter Canal, the first in England, and with the first use of a pound lock in England (engineer: John Trew of Glamorgan).

Navigation
 Pedro Nunes' work on navigation, Petri Nonii Salaciensis Opera, is published.

Events
 December 29 – Danish astronomer Tycho Brahe, while studying at the University of Rostock in Mecklenburg, loses part of his nose in a duel with fellow nobleman and relation Manderup Parsberg over a mathematical formula.

Births
 Giuseppe Biancani, Italian astronomer (died 1624)
 Jan Jesenius, Slovak physician (died 1621)
 Michal Sedziwój, Polish alchemist (died 1636)
 Caterina Vitale, Maltese pharmacist (died 1619)

Deaths
 May 4 – Luca Ghini, Italian physician and botanist (born 1490)
 May 10 – Leonhart Fuchs, German botanist (born 1501)
 July 2 – Nostradamus, French physician and astrologer (born 1503)
 July 30 – Guillaume Rondelet, French physician (born 1507)

References

 
16th century in science
1560s in science